The Girl Who Knew Too Much may refer to:

 The Girl Who Knew Too Much (1963 film), an Italian film directed by Mario Bava
 The Girl Who Knew Too Much (1969 film), an American film starring Adam West

See also 
 The Boy Who Knew Too Much (disambiguation)
 The Man Who Knew Too Much (disambiguation)